Milton Edward Graff (December 30, 1930 - August 2, 2005) was a Major League Baseball second baseman. He was born on Tuesday, December 30, 1930 in Jefferson Center, Pennsylvania. Graff attended Butler Senior High School and then attended Pennsylvania State University and Lycoming College. At Lycoming, he got a degree in accounting. He batted left-handed and threw right-handed.

Playing career
Around 1949, Graff was signed by the Pittsburgh Pirates as an amateur free agent. Around eight years later, during which his baseball career was interrupted when he enlisted in the Army to fight in the Korean War, Graff made his major league debut on April 16, 1957 at the age of 26 with the Kansas City Athletics (he was sent to the Athletics from the New York Yankees, by whom he'd been drafted in 1955). He wore the number 4.

In 61 major league games, Graff batted .179 with 4 doubles, 3 triples and 0 home runs. He showed a good eye at the plate by walking 15 times and striking out only 10 times. In the field, Graff committed 3 errors for a .988 fielding percentage. He also was involved in 36 double plays.

Graff played his final game on September 21, 1958.

On February 19, 1957, the New York Yankees sent Graff, Rip Coleman, Billy Hunter, Mickey McDermott, Tom Morgan and Irv Noren to the Kansas City Athletics for Art Ditmar, Bobby Shantz, Jack McMahan and Wayne Belardi.

Life after baseball
After baseball, Graff held several jobs in the field of accounting and was involved in baseball as scouting director and infield coach for the Pirates and director of stadium operations for Three Rivers Stadium. He was involved in the building of Three Rivers Stadium. He also was a scout for the Pirates, San Francisco Giants and Cincinnati Reds. He also held multiple front office jobs.

In 1987, Lycoming honored Graff with a distinguished alumni award.

On August 2, 2005, Graff died in Rockdale, Texas of complications from Alzheimers. He chose to be cremated.

References

External links

1930 births
2005 deaths
Asheville Tourists players
Baseball players from Pennsylvania
Birmingham Barons players
Buffalo Bisons (minor league) players
Burlington Bees (Carolina League) players
Charleston Rebels players
Dallas Rangers players
Neurological disease deaths in Texas
Deaths from Alzheimer's disease
Hutchinson Elks players
Kansas City Athletics players
Lycoming Warriors baseball players
Major League Baseball second basemen
New Orleans Pelicans (baseball) players
Penn State Nittany Lions baseball players
Pittsburgh Pirates coaches
Pittsburgh Pirates scouts
Portland Beavers players
Richmond Virginians (minor league) players
Tacoma Giants players
Uniontown Coal Barons players
Williamsport Grays players
American expatriate baseball players in Panama